Kotaro, Kōtarō or Koutarou (written: , , , , , , , , , ,  or  in katakana) is a masculine Japanese given name. Notable people with the name include:

, Japanese baseball player
, Japanese scientist and inventor
, Japanese photography critic and writer
, Japanese painter
, Japanese writer
, Japanese actor
, Japanese politician
, Japanese composer and music arranger
, Japanese general
, Japanese footballer and manager
, Japanese footballer
, Japanese guitarist
, Japanese baseball player
, Japanese racing driver
, Japanese actor
, Japanese hurdler
, Japanese chemical engineer
, Japanese economist and academic
, Japanese poet and sculptor
, Japanese politician
, Japanese jurist and politician
, Japanese photographer
, Japanese video game director and scenario writer
Kotaro Umeji, Japanese graphic designer
, Japanese footballer
, Japanese actor
, Japanese rugby union player
, Japanese jujutsuka

Fictional characters:
, a character in the manga series Haikyu!!
, a character in the anime series Zombie Land Saga
, a character in the 2007 anime samurai film Sword of the Stranger
, the protagonist of the tokusatsu series Kamen Rider Black
, the titular character of the manga and anime series Kotaro Lives Alone

Kotarō or Kotarou  (written:  or ) is a separate given name, though it may be romanized the same way. Notable people with the name include:

, Japanese ninja
, Japanese professional wrestler
, Japanese footballer

Fictional characters:
, protagonist of the manga series Pita-Ten
Kotarou Kashima (鹿島 虎太郎), a character from the manga and anime School Babysitters, younger brother of Ryuichi Kashima

See also
Kōtarō Makaritōru!, a Japanese manga series

Japanese masculine given names